Meeting House Hill is a common place name. It may refer to:

 Meeting House Hill in Boston's Dorchester neighborhood
 Meeting House Hill, Delaware
 South Meetinghouse in Portsmouth, New Hampshire
 South Sutton Meeting House in South Sutton, New Hampshire
 Daddy Frye's Hill Cemetery in Methuen, Massachusetts